Ernest-Lepage Ecological Reserve is an ecological reserve of Quebec, Canada. It was established on April 27, 1983.

References

External links
 Official website from Government of Québec

Protected areas of Gaspésie–Îles-de-la-Madeleine
Nature reserves in Quebec
Protected areas established in 1983
1983 establishments in Quebec